Otis Stanley Russ (August 31, 1930 – January 5, 2017) was an American politician who served in the Arkansas Senate from 1975 until 2001.

Early life
Russ was born in Conway, Arkansas in 1930 to Otis Stanley Russ and Gene Brown Russ. He attended Arkansas Polytechnic College from 1948 until 1950, transferred to Arkansas State Teachers College in 1950, and then transferred to the University of Arkansas where he graduated in 1952.

In July 1952, Russ enlisted in the United States Army, and served until July 1954. He also served in the Arkansas National Guard until September 1961.

Political career
Russ ran for the Arkansas Senate from the 21st district in 1974, in order to fill the vacancy caused by the expulsion of Guy H. Jones due to tax evasion. He came in second in the primary in January 1975 to Bill Sanson, who was supported by several local officials, but won in the runoff, 9,201–8,799. He won in the general election later that month with 90% of the vote, defeating Republican candidate Chuck Fourth. Russ ran for the United States House of Representatives in 1978 and 1984, but was unsuccessful, losing in the Democratic primary both times.

In 1995, Russ became President Pro Tempore of the Arkansas Senate. Due to his serving in this capacity, he acted as Governor several times while both the governor and the lieutenant governor were absent.

Personal life
Russ married Nina Benton in 1951. They had 2 children, and she died in 2005. He attended Calvary Baptist Church in Conway.

Russ died of cancer on January 5, 2017, at the age of 86. Upon his death, former President and Governor of Arkansas Bill Clinton remarked, "I loved working with him, when we agreed and when we didn't. Throughout his long service in the state Senate, everyone who worked with him held him in high regard."

References

1930 births
2017 deaths
Democratic Party Arkansas state senators
People from Conway, Arkansas
Arkansas Tech University alumni
University of Central Arkansas alumni
University of Arkansas alumni
Deaths from cancer in Arkansas